Miss Earth Republic of the Congo is the official title given to the Republic of the Congo's delegate to the Miss Earth pageant. The reigning titleholders dedicate their year to promote environmental projects and to address issues concerning the environment.

History 
In 2007, the Miss Earth Rep of the Congo franchise was obtained by Beauties of Africa Inc, owned by Andy Abulime.

The Republic of the Congo sent a representative to Miss Earth for the first time in 2008. The country was first represented by Katissia Christy Kouta, who won Miss Congo 2007, she competed in Miss Earth 2008.

Titleholders

Images

See also
Miss Earth 2007
Miss Earth 2008
Miss Earth DR Congo

References 

Congo
Beauty pageants in the Republic of the Congo